Householder is a surname. Notable people with the surname include:

Alston Scott Householder, American mathematician
Charlie Householder (1854–1913), American Major League Baseball player
Charlie Householder (utility player) (1855–1908) American professional baseball player
Ed Householder  (1869–1924), American baseball player
Eric Householder (born 1968), American politician from West Virginia
Fred Walter Householder (1913-1994), American linguist
George Householder (1825–1906), American politician and newspaper founder
Johanna Householder (born 1949), American-born Canadian performance artist
Larry Householder, American politician from Ohio
Ronney Householder, American racing driver
Paul Householder, Major League Baseball player and land baron

See also 

 Household
 Householder's method
 Ross E. Householder House

Surnames
Surnames of British Isles origin
English-language surnames
Occupational surnames
English-language occupational surnames